Joan is both a feminine form of the personal name John given to females in the Anglosphere; and the native masculine form of John (for males) in the Catalan-Valencian and Occitan languages.

The name was disseminated widely into many languages and cultures from the Greek name  (romanised), along with its feminine form  (romanised).

History 
The Anglosphere female name Joan entered the English language through the Old French forms, Johanne and Jehanne, female variants of the male name Johannes.

In Catalan-Valencian and Occitan, Joan has been in continuous use as the native, masculine form of John since at least the Middle Ages. Its feminine counterpart in these languages is Joana. Historically, Joan and Joam were also the main forms of John in medieval Portuguese (or Galician-Portuguese). The Lusophone world later diverged in adopting João  as its native form of the masculine John, while Joana, as in Catalan and Occitan, remains the female form for Portuguese speakers.

List of figures named Joan
Below are lists of people and fictional characters named or known as Joan. They are divided by gender and time period and within each list are presented alphabetically, by surname or title. Where the same name or title applies to more than one entry, each of the sub-entries for the group is listed in order of birth year.

Women

Medieval and early modern periods 
The following is a list of notable women known as Joan who lived in the Middle Ages (from around the 5th to the late 15th centuries) or in the early modern (late 15th century) period: 
 Joan of Arc (1431), patron saint of France, saint and martyr in Anglicanism and Catholicism
 Known as Joan I:
 Joan I, Countess of Burgundy (1191–1205)
 Joan I, Countess of Auvergne (1326–1360)
 Joan I, Countess of Dreux (1345–1346)
 Joan Beaufort, Countess of Westmorland ( – 1440), daughter of John of Gaunt, 1st Duke of Lancaster, wife of Ralph de Neville, 1st Earl of Westmorland and Robert Ferrers, 5th Baron Boteler of Wem
 Joan Beaufort, Queen of Scots (1445)
 Joan, Countess of Blois (died 1292)
 Joan, Duchess of Brittany (1319–1384)
 Women who were also called Joan of England:
 Joan of England, Queen of Sicily (1165–1199)
 Joan, Lady of Wales (1188–1237), wife of Llywelyn the Great, the Prince of Wales, and daughter of John, King of England
 Joan of England, Queen of Scotland (12101238)
 Joan of Acre, Countess of Gloucester (1272–1307) daughter of Edward I of England
 Joan of the Tower (1321–1362), first Queen consort of David II of Scotland
 Joan of Kent (1328–1385), Princess of Wales, "the fair maid of Kent", wife of Edward the Black Prince and mother of King Richard II of England
 Joan of England (1348), daughter of Edward III; betrothed to Peter of Castile, but died aged 14 of the Black Death while en route to Castile for her marriage
 Joan, Countess of Flanders (1244), also called Joan or Joanna of Constantinople
 Joan of France, Duchess of Berry (Saint Joan of Valois; 1464–1505), nun, and briefly Queen of France
 Joan of France, Duchess of Brittany 13911433
  Women also known as Joan of Habsburg:
 Joanna of Austria, Princess of Portugal (15351573)
 Joanna of Austria, Grand Duchess of Tuscany (15471578)
 Joan the Lame (1293–1348), first Queen consort of Philip VI of France
 Joan of Lancaster (1310–1345)
 Joan of Lusignan (died 1322)	
 Joan of Lestonnac (1556–1640), Saint Joanna of Toulouse
 Also called Joan of Naples:
 Joanna I of Naples (1325–1382)
 Joanna II of Naples (1373–1435)
 Joanna of Aragon, Queen of Naples (1454–1517), wife of Ferdinand I of Naples
 Joanna of Naples (1478–1518), Queen of Naples and queen consort of Ferdinand II of Naples
 Those known as Joan of Navarre:
 Joan I of Navarre (1273–1305)
 Joan II of Navarre (1312–1349), princess of France
 Joan of Navarre (1326–1387), nun, daughter of Joan II of Navarre and Philip III of Navarre
 Joan of Navarre, Queen of England (c. 13681437)
 Called Joan of Portugal:
 Joan of Portugal, queen of Castile (14391475)
 Joanna, Princess of Portugal (1452–1490) princess and Catholic saint
 Joana, Princess of Beira (1635–1653), Portuguese 
 Joan of Scotland, Countess of Morton (c. 14281486)
 Joan Shakespeare (1569–1646), sister of William Shakespeare
 Joan of Spain (1535–1573),  of Spain
 Women called Joan of Valois:
 Joan of Valois, Countess of Hainaut (1294–1352)
 Joan of Valois, Countess of Beaumont (1304–1363)
 Joan of Valois, Queen of Navarre (1343–1373)
 Joan of Valois, Duchess of Alençon (1409–1432)
 Joan of France, Duchess of Bourbon (1435–1482)

Modern era
The following is a list of notable women known as Joan who were born in the late modern (post-1800) and contemporary historical (post-1945) periods:
 Joan Allen (born 1956), American film actress
 Joan Anim-Addo, Grenadian-born academic, poet, playwright and publisher
 Joan Armatrading (born 1950), British singer
 Joan Baez (born 1941), American singer-songwriter
 Joan Barclay (1914–2002), American actress
 Joan Barnett (1945–2020), American casting director and television executive producer
 Joan Bennett (1910–1990), American actress
 Joan Benoit (born 1957), American marathon runner
 Joan Bielski (1923–2012), Australian activist
 Joan Blackman (born 1938), American actress
 Joan Blondell (1906–1979), American actress
 Joan Cather (1882–1967), British suffragette
 Joan Caulfield (1922–1991), American actress
 Joan Chandler (1923–1979), American actress
 Joan Collins (born 1933), English actress and author
 Joan Ganz Cooney (born 1929), American television producer
 Joan Cooper (1914–1999), English civil servant and social worker
 Joan Crawford (born between 1904 and 1908; died 1977), American actress
 Joan Crossley-Holland (1912–2005), English gallery owner and potter
 Joan Cusack (born 1962), American actress 
 Joan Davis (1907–1961), American actress and comedian
 Joan Didion (1934–2021), American writer
 Joan Dowling (1928–1954), British actress
 Joan Feynman (1927–2020), American astrophysicist
 Joan Bamford Fletcher (1909–1979), Canadian member of the First Aid Nursing Yeomanry
 Joan Fontaine (1917−2013), British-American actress
 Joan Gould (1927–2022), American author and journalist
 Joan Greenwood (1921−1987), English actress
 Joan Grounds (1939–2010), American-born Australian artist
 Joan Haanappel (born 1940), Dutch former figure skater and sports presenter
 Joan Hackett (1934–1983), American actress
 Joan B. Hague (active 1971–1982), American politician
 Joan Hansen (born 1958), American long-distance runner
 Joan Harnett (born 1943), New Zealand netball player and real estate agent
 Joan Hickson (1906–1998), English actress
 Joan Higginbotham (born 1963), American astronaut
 Joan Hotchkis (1927–2022), American actress
 Joan Humphreys, former Hong Kong international lawn bowler
 Joan Jara (born 1927), British-Chilean dancer and widow of Víctor Jara
 Joan Jefferson Farjeon (1913–2006), English scenographer and scenic designer
 Joan Jett (born 1958), American musician
 Joan O. Joshua (1912–1993), English veterinary surgeon, dog breeder and feminist
 Several women known as Joan Kennedy:
 Joan Kennedy (1908–1956), Canadian soldier
 Joan Kennedy Taylor (1926–2005), American writer and political activist
 Joan Bennett Kennedy (born 1936), American socialite, and first wife of U.S. Senator Ted Kennedy
 Joan Kennedy (–c. 2000), Canadian country music singer
 Joan Marie Laurer ("Chyna"; 1969–2016), American pornographic actress, bodybuilder, model, and former professional wrestler
 Joan Lawson (1907–2002), English ballet dancer and writer
 Joan Leemhuis-Stout (born 1946), Dutch politician
 Joan Le Mesurier (1931–2021), English actress and author
 Joan Leslie (1925–2015), American actress
 Joan Lin (born 1953), Taiwanese actress
 Joan Lindsay (1896–1984), Australian author, best known for her novel Picnic at Hanging Rock
 Joan Littlewood (1914–2002), English theatre director
 Joan Lunden (born 1950), American journalist, author and television presenter 
 Joan Moriarty (1923–2020), British nursing administrator
 Joan O'Malley (active 1964–1996), Canadian civil servant
 Joan Onyemaechi Mrakpor (born 1966), Nigerian politician
 Joan Orenstein (1923–2009), Canadian actress
 Joan Osborne (born 1962), American singer-songwriter
 Joan Plowright (born 1929), English actress
 Joan Redwing (active from ), materials scientist and professor at Pennsylvania State University
 Joan Regan (1928–2013), English singer
 Joan Rivers (1933–2014), American comedian, talk show host and businesswoman
 Joan R. Rosenblatt (1926–2018), American statistician
 Joni Robbins (born Joan Eva Rothman; died 2020), American voice actress
 Joan Silber (born 1945), American writer 
 Joan Sims (1930–2001), English actress
 Joan Micklin Silver (1935–2020), American film director
 Joan Staniswalis (1957–2018), American statistician
 Joan Steinbrenner (1935–2018), American vice-chair of the New York Yankees baseball team
 Joan Sutherland (1926–2010), Australian opera singer
 Joan Sydney (1936–2022), English-Australian actress 
 Joan Tewkesbury (born 1936), American film and television director and screenwriter
 Joan Tower (born 1938), American composer
 Joan Vass (1925-2011), American fashion designer.
 Joan Wexler (born 1946), American Dean and President of Brooklyn Law School
 Joan Wyndham (1921–2007), British writer and memoirist

Men
The following is a list of notable men known as Joan:
 Joan Adon (born 1998), MLB pitcher for Washington Nationals
 Joan Blaeu (1596–1673), Dutch cartographer
 Joan Boada, Cuban ballet dancer
 Joan Capdevila (born 1978), Spanish footballer
 Joan Comorera (1894–1958), Spanish communist politician
 Joan Cornellà (born 1981), Spanish cartoonist and illustrator
 Joan Daemen (born 1965), Belgian cryptographer and inventor of Rijndael
 Joan Ignasi Elena (born 1968), Catalan politician
 Joan Gamper (1877–1930), Swiss-born Spanish footballer and businessman most famous as the founder of FC Barcelona
 Joan Gaspart (born 1944), Spanish businessman and president of FC Barcelona (2000–2003)
 Joan Laporta (born 1962), Spanish lawyer and president of FC Barcelona (2003–2010)
 Joan Llaneras (born 1969), Spanish track cyclist
 Joan Majó (born 1938), Spanish politician
 Joan Martorell (1833–1906), Spanish architect
 Joan Mir (born 1997), Spanish motorcycle racer
 Joan Miró (1893–1983), Spanish artist
 Joan Oumari (born 1988), Lebanese footballer  
 Joan Ribó (born 1947), Spanish politician
 Joan Roca i Fontané (born 1964), Spanish chef
 Joan Sebastian (1951–2015), Mexican vocalist
 Joan Manuel Serrat (born 1943), Spanish songwriter
 Joan Villadelprat, Former Operations Director and Team Manager at Benetton Formula
 Joan Verdú (born 1983), Spanish footballer
 Joan Voûte (1879–1963), Dutch astronomer
 Joan van der Waals (1920–2022), Dutch physicist

Fictional characters
Legendary or fictional characters called Joan include:
 Pope Joan, 9th century legend
 Joan Clayton, a character from the TV series Girlfriends, played by Tracee Ellis Ross
 The clone of Joan of Arc is a main character in Clone high
 Lt. Joan Dark, a character from the 2019 film Doom: Annihilation
 Joan Ferguson, a character from the TV series Wentworth
 Joan Holloway, Mad Men character
 Joan Lawson, a character from Small Wonder, played by Marla Pennington
 Sow Joan, an Animal Crossing series character
 Joan Watson, a character from the TV series Elementary, played by Lucy Liu

See also
 All Wikipedia pages starting with "Joan..."
 Darby and Joan, expression for a happily married couple who led a placid, uneventful life
 Joanie

Explanatory notes

References

English feminine given names
Dutch masculine given names
Catalan masculine given names
Unisex given names